Park Se-ryong (born 13 August 1959) is a South Korean former cyclist. He competed in the individual road race event at the 1984 Summer Olympics and 1982 Asian Games.

References

External links
 

1959 births
Living people
South Korean male cyclists
Olympic cyclists of South Korea
Cyclists at the 1984 Summer Olympics
Place of birth missing (living people)
Asian Games medalists in cycling
Cyclists at the 1982 Asian Games
Asian Games gold medalists for South Korea
Medalists at the 1982 Asian Games
20th-century South Korean people
21st-century South Korean people